Before the Act of Union 1707, the barons of the shire of Clackmannan elected commissioners to represent them in the unicameral Parliament of Scotland and in the Convention of Estates. After 1708, Clackmannanshire and Kinross-shire alternated in returning one member to the House of Commons of Great Britain and later to the House of Commons of the United Kingdom.

List of shire commissioners

 1617: Robert Bruce, laird of Clackmannan
 1639-1641: Sir Thomas Hope of Kerse
 1639-1640: Sir Alexander Shaw of Sauchie; elected to serve in Hope's absence as necessary
 1644 (convention): — Stewart, laird of Rosyth
 1644: Sir Charles Erskine of Bandeath
 1648: Robert Meldrum of Tillibody
 1649-1650: Sir Charles Erskine of Bandeath
 1650-1651: Sir Andrew Rollo, laird of Duncrub
 During the Protectorate, Linlithgowshire, Stirlingshire and Clackmannanshire jointly returned one member to the Commonwealth Parliament.
 1654-1655: Thomas Read
 1656-1658: Godfrey Rodes
 1659-1660: Adrian Scrope
 1661-1663: Sir Henry Bruce of Clackmannan
 1665 (convention): Sir Charles Erskine of Alva and Cambuskenneth
 1667 (convention): Sir Henry Bruce of Clackmannan
 1667 (convention): Sir Charles Erskine of Alva and Cambuskenneth
 1669-1674: Sir Henry Bruce of Clackmannan
 1678 (convention): David Bruce of Clackmannan
 1681-1682: Sir William Sharp of Tullibodie
 1685-1686: David Bruce of Clackmannan
 1689 (convention): David Bruce of Clackmannan 
 1689: David Bruce of Clackmannan (seat declared vacant 28 April 1693 as he had not signed the assurance; vacant again 21 May 1700 as he had not signed the Association)
 1700-1702: Sir John Erskine of Alva
 1703-1707: Alexander Abercromby of Tullibody

References
Joseph Foster, Members of Parliament, Scotland, 1882.

Constituencies of the Parliament of Scotland (to 1707)
Politics of Clackmannanshire
Constituencies disestablished in 1707
1707 disestablishments in Scotland